Sir Pépin de Wierre (died 1350), Lord of Maison-Ponthieu, was a French nobleman.

Biography
Wierre joined with other French nobles in an attempt in 1349 to recapture Calais by bribing Amerigo of Pavia, an Italian officer of the city garrison, to open a gate for them. Having entered the gatehouse, the drawbridge was suddenly raised, a portcullis fell in front of the French and sixty English men-at-arms surrounded them. Amerigo had betrayed the French to King Edward III of England. The ensuing battle outside the gates of Calais, resulted in the deaths of Wierre and many of the French and a number were also captured, including the French commander Geoffrey de Charny. 

He was succeeded by his son Robert.

Notes

Citations

References

 
 

Year of birth unknown
1350 deaths
14th-century French people
French soldiers
People of the Hundred Years' War
Place of birth missing
Lords of France